Klaus-Jürgen Grünke (born 30 March 1951) is a retired track cyclist from East Germany, who represented his native country at the 1976 Summer Olympics in Montreal, Canada. There he won the gold medal in the men's 1,000m time trial, defeating Belgium's Michel Vaarten. A year earlier he won the world title in the same event in Rocourt.

References

External links

 

1951 births
Living people
People from Saalekreis
East German male cyclists
Cyclists at the 1976 Summer Olympics
Olympic cyclists of East Germany
Olympic gold medalists for East Germany
Olympic medalists in cycling
Cyclists from Saxony-Anhalt
Medalists at the 1976 Summer Olympics
East German track cyclists
People from Bezirk Halle